Genaro Matias Prono Britez (born April 29, 1989) is a Paraguayan swimmer, who specialized in breaststroke events. Prono is a member of the swimming team for Auburn Tigers, and a graduate of marketing at Auburn University in Auburn, Alabama. He is also a resident athlete of the Pine Crest Swim Team in Fort Lauderdale, Florida, where he trained with numerous world-class swimmers, including three-time Olympian Bradley Ally of Barbados, and freestyle specialist Daniele Tirabassi of Venezuela.

Prono qualified for the men's 100 m breaststroke at the 2008 Summer Olympics in Beijing, by clearing a FINA B-standard entry time of 1:03.35 from the Charlotte UltraSwim Prix in Charlotte, North Carolina. He challenged seven other swimmers on the third heat, including three-time Olympians Malick Fall from Senegal, and Alwin de Prins of Luxembourg. Prono edged out Fall to snatch a third spot by 0.19 of a second, breaking his personal best and Paraguayan record of 1:02.32. Prono failed to advance into the semifinals, as he placed forty-first out of 65 swimmers on the first night of the preliminaries.

References

External links
Player Bio – Auburn Tigers
NBC Olympics Profile

Paraguayan male swimmers
Living people
Olympic swimmers of Paraguay
Swimmers at the 2008 Summer Olympics
Male breaststroke swimmers
Sportspeople from Asunción
Auburn Tigers men's swimmers
1989 births
Swimmers at the 2007 Pan American Games
Swimmers at the 2011 Pan American Games
Pan American Games competitors for Paraguay
20th-century Paraguayan people
21st-century Paraguayan people